Gagea minima, known as the least gagea, is a Eurasian species of plants in the lily family.

Its native range is quite large, as it is found in much of south-central, southeastern, central and northern Europe (Italy, Germany, Scandinavia, and from there eastwards into European Russia), with additional populations in the Caucasus region.

Gagea minima  is a bulb-forming perennial up to 20 cm tall. Flowers are bright lemon yellow, sometimes green on the underside of the tepals.

References

External links
Naturegate, Least gagea
Czech Botany, Gagea minima, křivatec nejmenší / krivec najmenší
Biopix
Free Nature Images

minima
Plants described in 1753
Taxa named by Carl Linnaeus
Flora of Europe
Flora of the Caucasus